Daryl Gilmore (born 12 April 1961) is a former Australian rules footballer who played with Carlton in the Victorian Football League (VFL).

Notes

External links 

Daryl Gilmore's profile on Blueseum

1961 births
Carlton Football Club players
Eaglehawk Football Club players
Australian rules footballers from Victoria (Australia)
Living people